Kate Farley Sanderson (born 1 March 2000) is a Canadian swimmer. She competed in the women's 5 km and women's 10 km events at the 2019 World Aquatics Championships held in Gwangju, South Korea. In the 5 km event she finished in 24th place and in the 10 km event she finished in 35th place. In 2019, she also competed in the women's marathon 10 kilometres at the Pan American Games held in Lima, Peru and she finished in 6th place.

In 2018, she finished in 10th place in the women's 10 kilometre open water at the Pan Pacific Swimming Championships in Tokyo, Japan. She also competed in the women's 800 metre freestyle and women's 1500 metre freestyle events.

She represented Canada at the 2020 Summer Olympics in Tokyo, Japan in the women's marathon 10 kilometre event. She finished in 18th place.

References

External links 
 
 
 Kate Farley Sanderson at the 2019 Pan American Games

2000 births
Living people
Canadian female swimmers
Canadian female freestyle swimmers
Swimmers from Toronto
Pan American Games competitors for Canada
Swimmers at the 2019 Pan American Games
Canadian female long-distance swimmers
Swimmers at the 2020 Summer Olympics
Olympic swimmers of Canada
21st-century Canadian women